Desk Trickery is a studio album by Doldrums, released in 1999 by Kranky.

Critical reception
The Chicago Tribune wrote that Doldrums "embrace playing for the fun of it, stretching out on extended improvisations that owe as much to the Grateful Dead and Balinese gamelan music as they do to Can and Popul Vuh."

Track listing

Personnel 
Adapted from the Desk Trickery liner notes.

Doldrums
 Justin Chearno – guitar
 Bill Kellum – bass guitar
 Matt Kellum – drums

Production and additional personnel
 Sean Halleck – engineering

Release history

References

External links 
 

1999 albums
Doldrums (band) albums
Kranky albums